Billesholm was a locality situated in Bjuv Municipality, Skåne County, Sweden with 2,910 inhabitants in 2010. By 2015 it has merged with Bjuv and lost its "locality" status.

References 

Populated places in Skåne County
Populated places in Bjuv Municipality